is a 2008 Japanese drama film written and directed by Yuki Tanada. The film is a variation on seishun-eiga and family drama that tells the story from a woman's perspective. The troubled 21-year-old female protagonist named Suzuko Sato (Yū Aoi) sets out on a journey to escape troubles and lives on her own terms by saving up one million Yen each time, but ultimately finds that grass is always greener on the other side.

In Japanese films, it is unusual for the girls to take initiative, however, One Million Yen Girl was able to subversively redefine this narrative. This is one of the most popular films by Yuki Tanada that incorporates feminism and aims toward redefining the gender role and space for woman in the film industry. With a middle ground budget and some promotions, this film has comfortably found success and won awards.

Plot
Suzuko Sato (Yū Aoi) is an unremarkable young teen that has trouble fitting in. While her younger brother is often praised for his smarts, her family & neighbors often judges her decisions.

One day at work, Suzuko's co-worker Riko offers to become roommates with her. Suzuko jumps at that chance to move out of her parents' house and they set out to find an apartment. Unfortunately, Riko never mentions her plan to have her boyfriend Takeshi live with them – until after they sign the lease on their apartment. Making matters worse, on their big moving day, Suzuko finds Riko a no-show but her boyfriend Takeshi sits glumly in the apartment. It turns out that the couple recently experienced a falling out, with the boyfriend still intending to move into the apartment without his girlfriend. Things then hit the boiling point when Takeshi throws out Suzuko's cat. Suzuko retaliates the next day by throwing away all of his belongings and then quickly moves out before Takeshi returns.

The next day at work, Suzuko is visited by detectives who ask Suzuko to come in for questioning. She is briefly imprisoned and receives a criminal record for breaking the law by throwing away Takeshi's belongings. When news of this spreads to Suzuko's neighborhood and family, Suzuko suddenly feels even more alienated especially after being blamed by her brother Takuya for her bad reputation. As a resolution, she decides to find a menial job and save up one million yen with the goal of moving out of town.

From then on, whenever she finds herself in trouble, she saves up one million yen through her menial job and moves to a new place, but trouble seems to always find her, similar to her brother at home.

Cast 
 Yū Aoi as Suzuko Sato, a 21-year-old woman who tries to define her own rules and avoids her problems by saving up one million yen and moving away.
 Mirai Moriyama as Ryohei Nakajima, Suzuko's love interest and co-worker.
 Ryusei Saito as Takuya Sato, Suzuko's younger brother who is seen as the ideal child, but has problem at school and looks up to his sister.
 Pierre Taki as Haruo Fujii, an older peach farmer who awkwardly looks out for Suzuko.
 Sumie Sasaki as Fujii Kinu, an elderly woman who offered Suzuko a job picking peaches.
 Takashi Sasano as Siraishi - Master of Kissaten 'White', an elderly man who found Suzuko in a cafe and offered to find her a job.
 Terunosuke Takezai as Yuuki, a flirt who tried to hit on Suzuko.
 Kami Hiraiwa as Riko, Suzuko's co-worker and supposed roommate.
 Tomohisa Yuge as Takeshi, Riko's ex-boyfriend and Suzuko's brief roommate.
 Noriko Eguchi as Yayoi Asano, Takuya's school teacher.
 Kota Mizumori as Noguchi

Production

Writing
One Million Yen Girl was written and directed by Yuki Tanada. When asked about the sources of inspiration and the writing, she stated that she wanted her films to be about just an ordinary person who has to deal with problems that would ordinarily would arise in life.

Casting 
The lead actress in One Million Yen Girl named Yū Aoi worked with Yuki Tanada before and after this film. However, other actors and actresses are not known to have worked with the director before or after this film.

Crew 
On top of the woman director and actress, the film also consists of mostly woman production crews. The producers are Ko Hirano, who has worked on 16 other films, and Koko Maeda, who has helped to produce Kill Bill: Vol. 1, Kill Bill: Vol. 2, and many others. The cinematographer, Kei Yasuda has also worked on many other films including one with Yuki Tanada's Moon and Cherry (2004). The editors, Takashige Kikui and Ryûji Miyajima are established and have worked on more than 20 other films. However, the music composers, Ko Hirano and Eiko Sakurai were only starting out when the film was made.

Reception

Box office
One Million Yen Girl was initially released in Japan and Taiwan as of 2008. The recorded estimated box office gross receipts of approximately $3.9 million.

Critical response 
One Million Yen Girl was selected as the winner of the Directors Guild of Japan New Directors Award in 2008. The film has also won My Movies Audience Award of the Far East Film Festival that took place in Undine, Italy in 2009. This is the first film that Yuki Tanada was able to find success using the middle ground budget which many other Japanese directors have struggled with because the Japanese film industry is mainly divided into only two industry: the mega budget and the low budget.

References

Footnotes

External links 
 
 

2008 drama films
2008 films
Japanese drama films
Works by Yuki Tanada
2000s Japanese films